Michael Edward Utley (born 1947) is an American musician, songwriter, record producer, and musical director for Jimmy Buffett's Coral Reefer Band.

Early life and education
Utley was born in Blytheville in Mississippi County, Arkansas. In 1969, he graduated from the University of Arkansas with a degree in zoology. He then debated either taking pre-med lab exam or going to Memphis and help Tony Joe White record his second album and chose the latter. 

In college, he was a member of the Sigma Chi Fraternity. He was recognized by Sigma Chi as a Significant Sig in 2017.

Career
In 1970, Atlantic Records executive Jerry Wexler invited Utley to work at Criteria Studios. Utley worked with the house band for Atlantic Records in Miami, Florida's Criteria Studios backing performers such as Aretha Franklin, Jerry Jeff Walker, and the Allman Brothers and in California playing with Rita Coolidge and Kris Kristofferson.

In 1973, Jerry Jeff Walker recruited Utley to play keyboard instruments on Buffett's first major label album, A White Sport Coat and a Pink Crustacean. Utley continued to work with other performers in the mid-1970s while appearing on Buffett's subsequent albums until Buffett's 1977 breakout Changes in Latitudes, Changes in Attitudes when he joined the Coral Reefer Band full-time.

Utley has title credit on several albums, the first being an instrumental record with fellow Coral Reefer Band member Robert Greenidge titled Mad Music.

Utley has produced or co-produced several of Buffett albums beginning with One Particular Harbour in 1983. Since 1981, he has toured with the Coral Reefers.

Personal life
Utley's son is married to the daughter of Mac McAnally, also a member of the Coral Reefer Band.

In popular media
During Jimmy Buffett's 1979 song "Volcano," Utley's name is mentioned. Right before the first solo, Jimmy Buffett says "Mr. Utley." This leads into the solo.

Discography
Robert Greenidge & Michael Utley (as Club Trini). Mad Music MCA 5695. (1986).  re-released on CD (11/05).
Robert Greenidge & Michael Utley (as Club Trini). Jubilee (1987).  re-released on CD (12/05).
Robert Greenidge & Michael Utley (as Club Trini). Heat (1988).
Robert Greenidge & Michael Utley (as Club Trini). Club Trini. (1996).
Robert Greenidge & Michael Utley (as Club Trini). Back in Town. (1999).
Robert Greenidge & Michael Utley (as Club Trini). Margarita Cafe: Late Night Live. (2000).

See also
Jimmy Buffett discography

References

1947 births
20th-century American keyboardists
20th-century American male musicians
20th-century American pianists
21st-century American keyboardists
21st-century American male musicians
21st-century American pianists
21st-century organists
American rock keyboardists
American rock pianists
American male organists
American male pianists
American male songwriters
American organists
American session musicians
Coral Reefer Band members
Living people
People from Blytheville, Arkansas
Record producers from Arkansas
Songwriters from Arkansas
University of Arkansas alumni